Garrett Pilon (born April 13, 1998), is an American-born Canadian professional ice hockey centre who is currently playing for the Hershey Bears in the American Hockey League (AHL) while under contract to the Washington Capitals of the National Hockey League (NHL). He was drafted 87th overall, in the third round of the 2016 NHL Entry Draft by the Washington Capitals.

Playing career
On May 8, 2021, Pilon made his NHL debut against the Philadelphia Flyers.

On 16 November 2021, Pilon scored his first NHL goal against the Anaheim Ducks.

Personal life
Pilon's father, Rich, played 15 seasons in the NHL, most notably for the New York Islanders.

Career statistics

References

External links
 

1998 births
Living people
Canadian ice hockey centres
Everett Silvertips players
Hershey Bears players
Ice hockey players from New York (state)
Kamloops Blazers players
Washington Capitals draft picks
Washington Capitals players